This is a list of years in the Peninsular Malaysia until 1963 and Malaysia since 1963. See also Timeline of Malaysian history.

16th century

17th century

18th century

19th century

20th century

21st century

 
History of Malaysia
Malaysia history-related lists
Malaysia